Justice Terrell may refer to:

George Whitfield Terrell, associate justice of the Texas Supreme Court
William Glenn Terrell, associate justice of the Florida Supreme Court

See also
Samuel H. Terral, associate justice of the Mississippi Supreme Court